Nonlabens aestuariivivens is a Gram-negative, aerobic and non-motile bacterium from the genus of Nonlabens which has been isolated from tidal flat from Oido.

References

Flavobacteria
Bacteria described in 2017